Amelometasone (developmental code name TS-410) is a synthetic glucocorticoid corticosteroid which was never marketed.

References

Secondary alcohols
Diketones
Organofluorides
Glucocorticoids
Propionate esters